Macassar, Makassar or Makasar may refer to:

Places, people, language

Makassar, a city in Indonesia
Makassar Strait, a strait in Indonesia
Makassar people, ethnic group inhabiting the southern part of the South Peninsula, in Sulawesi 
Makassarese language, also known as Makassar - one of a group of languages known as Makassaric languages 
Makasar script, historical letters used to write Makassarese language
Makasar (Unicode block)

Place names derived from original
Pante Macassar, a city in East Timor
Makasar, Jakarta, a district of East Jakarta, Indonesia
Macassar, Western Cape, a town in South Africa
Macassar Village, Western Cape, an informal settlement in South Africa
Macassar, Mozambique, a village in north-eastern Mozambique

Other
Macassar oil, a hair oil
Antimacassar, a cloth to protect chairs against soiling by the oil
Diospyros celebica or Makassar ebony, a species of flowering tree in the family Ebenaceae, endemic to the island of Sulawesi
Makassar-class landing platform dock, a class of amphibious warfare ships
"Makassar", a song by Al Bano and Romina Power

Media
 Kompas TV Makassar, previously named Makassar TV, regional television in Makassar, Indonesia
 Auntie Macassar, clown character from The Big Comfy Couch TV show seasons 1–5

See also
 Makassarese (disambiguation)
 Makassan contact with Australia, contact of the Makassar people with Australia
Makassar uprising

Language and nationality disambiguation pages